The Ripley Academy (previously known as Mill Hill School, before this, The Benjamin Outram Secondary Modern School) is a secondary school and sixth form located in Ripley, Derbyshire, England.
Ripley Academy opened on 8 September 2014 as part of the East Midlands Education Trust, which currently has fifteen schools in the East Midlands. The Ripley Academy was a founding member, along with the West Bridgford School.

In the late 1990s, under the leadership of headmaster Tony Stephens, Mill Hill School had a good reputation, with around 60% of students scoring 5 or more GCSE grades A*-C.

References

External links 
The Ripley Academy official website

Secondary schools in Derbyshire
Academies in Derbyshire